The 2012 Kashiwa Reysol season is Kashiwa Reysol's second season in J. League Division 1 since 2009 and 40th overall in the Japanese top flight. It also includes the 2011 J. League Cup, and the 2011 Emperor's Cup.

Players

Transfers

Winter

In:

Out:

Summer

In:

Out:

Competitions

Super Cup

J. League

Results

League table

J. League Cup

Emperor's Cup

AFC Champions League

Knockout stages

Squad statistics

Appearances and goals

|-
|colspan="14"|Players who appeared for Kashiwa Reysol that left on loan during the season:

|-
|colspan="14"|Players who appeared for Kashiwa Reysol that left during the season:

|}

Top scorers

Disciplinary record

References

Kashiwa Reysol
Kashiwa Reysol seasons